Fergus Walsh (born September 1961) is a British journalist who has been the BBC's medical editor since 2020, a newly created role, having previously been its long-time medical correspondent since 2006. He has won several awards for medical journalism, and has been commended for his work in making important health topics more understandable to the public.

Education
He attended the Royal Grammar School in High Wycombe, and obtained an English literature degree from Leeds University in 1983.
Walsh completed a post-graduate course in Broadcast Journalism at University College Falmouth, in Cornwall.

Career
Walsh became the BBC's medical correspondent in 2004. In 2020 he was promoted to the newly created title of medical editor in recognition of his work in relation to the COVID-19 pandemic.

Awards

He has won five broadcasting awards from the Medical Journalists' Association. In December 2009, he received an honorary degree, a Doctorate of Civil Law (DCL) from Newcastle University. His citation stated that he had "done more than any other journalist to facilitate public comprehension of the most challenging health issues of our times".

Personal life

Fergus Walsh was born on September 1961. He is married and has a son and two daughters.  His wife, a former GP, works in the pharmaceutical industry.

In May 2020, Walsh announced he had tested positive for antibodies of COVID-19, during the global pandemic of the disease.

References

External links

LEPRA Website

British reporters and correspondents
BBC newsreaders and journalists
English television presenters
Living people
People educated at the Royal Grammar School, High Wycombe
1961 births